Shek Kwu Lung is a village in Tai Po District, Hong Kong.

Administration
Shek Kwu Lung is one of the villages represented within the Tai Po Rural Committee. For electoral purposes, Shek Kwu Lung is part of the San Fu constituency, which was formerly represented by Max Wu Yiu-cheong until May 2021.

Shek Kwu Lung is a recognized village under the New Territories Small House Policy.

History
At the time of the 1911 census, the population of Shek Kwu Lung was 72. The number of males was 30.

References

External links

 Delineation of area of existing village Shek Kwu Lung (Tai Po) for election of resident representative (2019 to 2022)

Villages in Tai Po District, Hong Kong